The Bosporus Strait ('Istanbul strait', colloquially Boğaz) or Bosphorus Strait is a natural strait and an internationally significant waterway located in Istanbul in northwestern Turkey. It forms part of the continental boundary between Asia and Europe, and divides Turkey by separating Anatolia from Thrace. It is the world's narrowest strait used for international navigation.

Most of the shores of the Bosporus Strait, except for the area to the north, are heavily settled, with the city of Istanbul's metropolitan population of 17 million inhabitants extending inland from both banks.

The Bosporus Strait and the Dardanelles Strait at the opposite end of the Sea of Marmara are together known as the Turkish Straits.

Sections of the shore of the Bosporus in Istanbul have been reinforced with concrete or rubble and those sections of the Strait prone to deposition are periodically dredged.

Name 
"cattle strait" (or "Ox-ford"), from the genitive of   'ox, cattle' +   'passage', thus meaning 'cattle-passage', or 'cow passage'. This is a reference to the Greek mythological story of Io, who was transformed into a cow and condemned to wander the Earth until she crossed the Bosporus, where she met the Titan Prometheus, who comforted her by telling her that she would be restored to human form by Zeus and become the ancestor of the greatest of all heroes, Heracles (Hercules).

Io supposedly went ashore near Chrysopolis (present-day Üsküdar), which was named  'the Cow'. The same site was also known as Damalis, as it was where the Athenian general Chares had erected a monument to his wife Damalis, which included a colossal statue of a cow (the name  translating to 'heifer').

The 12th-century Greek scholar John Tzetzes calls it  (after Damalis), but he also reports that in popular usage the strait was known as  during his day, the name of the most ancient northern harbour of Constantinople. In English the preferred spelling tends to be Bosphorus.

Historically, the Bosporus was also known as the "Strait of Constantinople", or the Thracian Bosporus to distinguish it from the Cimmerian Bosporus in Crimea. Other names used by Herodotus to refer to the strait include Chalcedonian Bosporus ([], Herodotus 4.87), or Mysian Bosporus.

The term eventually came to be used as the common noun , meaning "a strait", and was also formerly applied to the Hellespont in Classical Greek by Aeschylus and Sophocles.

The link between Oxford and Bosporus as interchangeable terms has also been highlighted by Bosporus Press, a poetry imprint based in Oxford.

Geography 
As a maritime waterway, the Bosporus specifically connects the Black Sea to the Sea of Marmara and thence to the Aegean and Mediterranean seas via the Dardanelles. It also connects various seas along the Eastern Mediterranean, the Balkans, the Near East, and Western Eurasia. Thus, the Bosporus allows maritime connections from the Black Sea all the way to the Mediterranean Sea and the Atlantic Ocean via Gibraltar, and to the Indian Ocean through the Suez Canal, making it a crucial international waterway, in particular for the passage of goods coming from Russia.

There is one very small island in the Bosporus just off Kuruçeşme. Now generally known as Galatasaray Island (Galatasaray Adası), this was given to the Armenian architect Sarkis Balyan by Sultan Abdülhamid II in 1880. The house he built on it was later demolished and the island became a walled garden and then a water sports centre before being given to the Galatsaray Sports Club, hence its name. However, in the 2010s it was completely overbuilt with nightclubs which were torn down in 2017. It reopened to the public in the summer of 2022.

Formation 

The exact cause and date of the formation of the Bosporus remain a subject of debate among geologists. One recent hypothesis, dubbed the Black Sea deluge hypothesis, which was launched by a study of the same name in 1997 by two scientists from Columbia University, postulates that the Bosporus was flooded around 5600 BCE (revised to 6800 BCE in 2003) when the rising waters of the Mediterranean Sea and the Sea of Marmara broke through to the Black Sea, which at the time, according to the hypothesis, was a low-lying body of fresh water.

Many geologists, however, claim that the strait is much older, even if relatively young on a geologic timescale.

Present morphology 
The limits of the Bosporus are defined as the line connecting the lighthouses of Rumeli Feneri and Anadolu Feneri in the north, and between the Ahırkapı Feneri and the Kadıköy İnciburnu Feneri in the south ("Fener" is Turkish for lighthouse).

The southbound flow of water is 16 000 m3/s (fresh water at the surface) and the northbound flow is 11 000 m3/s (salt water near the bottom). Dr. Dan Parsons and researchers at the University of Leeds School of Earth and Environment describe a Black Sea undersea river.

The Golden Horn is an estuary off the main strait that historically acted as a moat to protect Constantinople from attack, as well as providing sheltered anchorage for the imperial navies of various empires until the 19th century, after which it became a historic neighbourhood at the heart of Istanbul.

Newer explorations 
Before the 20th century it was already known that the Black Sea and the Sea of Marmara flow into each other in a geographic example of "density flow". Then in August 2010, a continuous 'underwater channel' of suspension composition was discovered flowing along the floor of the Bosporus, which would be the sixth largest river on Earth if it were on land. The 2010 team of scientists, led by the University of Leeds, used a robotic "yellow submarine" to observe detailed flows within this "undersea river", scientifically referred to as a submarine channel, for the first time. Submarine channels are similar to land rivers, but they are formed by density currents—underwater flow mixtures of sand, mud and water that are denser than sea water and so sink and flow along the bottom. These channels are the main transport pathway for sediments to the deep sea where they form sedimentary deposits.

The team studied the detailed flow within these channels and its findings included that:

The central tenet of the Black Sea deluge hypothesis is that as the ocean rose  at the end of the last Ice Age when the massive ice sheets melted, the sealed Bosporus was overwhelmed by a spectacular flood that increased the then fresh water Black Sea Lake by 50%, and drove people back from the shores for many months. This hypothesis was supported by the findings of undersea explorer Robert Ballard, who discovered settlements along the old shoreline; scientists dated the flood to 7500 BP or 5500 BC from fresh-salt water microflora. Driven out by the rapidly rising water, which must have been terrifying and inexplicable, people spread to all corners of the Western world carrying the story of a major flood. As the waters surged, they scoured a network of sea-floor channels less resistant to denser suspended solids in liquid, which remains a very active layer today.

The first images of these submarine channels showing them to be of great size, were obtained in 1999 during a NATO SACLANT Undersea Research project using jointly the NATO RV Alliance, and the Turkish Navy survey ship Çubuklu. In 2002, a survey carried out on board the Ifremer RV Le Suroit for BlaSON project (Lericolais, et al., 2003) completed the multibeam mapping of this underwater channel fan-delta. A complete map was published in 2009 using these previous results together with high quality mapping obtained in 2006 (by researchers at Memorial University of Newfoundland who were project partners in the study).

The project was led by Jeff Peakall and Daniel Parsons at the University of Leeds, in collaboration with the University of Southampton, Memorial University of Newfoundland, and the Institute of Marine Sciences. The survey was run and coordinated from the Institute of Marine Sciences research ship, the R/V Koca Piri Reis.

Villages 
The shores of the Bosporus were once lined with small fishing villages that had grown up since Byzantine times but really came into their own in the 19th century. Until the early 20th century most were only accessible by boat (known as caiques) along the Bosporus since there were no coast roads. Today the villages are no more than suburbs of Greater Istanbul but many retain the memory of their original village status in the suffix '-köy (village' to their names. e.g. Ortaköy, Yeniköy, Arnavutköy, Çengelköy and Vaniköy. These villages often had distinct identities associated with agriculture: Arnavutköy, for example, was associated with strawberry-growing while Çengelköy was famous for its sweet cucumbers.

History 
As part of the only passage between the Black Sea and the Mediterranean, the Bosporus has always been of great importance from a commercial and military point of view, and it remains strategically important today. It is a major sea access route for numerous countries, including Russia and Ukraine. Control over it has been an objective of a number of conflicts in modern history, notably the Russo-Turkish War (1877–78), as well as of the attack of the Allied Powers on the Dardanelles during the 1915 Battle of Gallipoli in the course of World War I. In 2022 during the Russian invasion of Ukraine the Bosporus' importance as a route by which grain reached the world was thrown into sharp profile.

Ancient Greek, Persian, Roman and Byzantine eras (pre-1453) 

The strategic importance of the Bosporus dates back millennia. In the 5th century BC the Greek city-state of Athens, which depended on grain imports from the Black Sea ports of Scythia, maintained critical alliances with cities which controlled the straits, such as the Megarian colony of Byzantium.

In an attempt to subdue the Scythian horsemen who roamed across the north of the Black Sea, the Persian King Darius I the Great crossed the Bosporus, then marched towards the River Danube. His army crossed the Bosporus using an enormous bridge made by connecting boats. This bridge essentially connected the farthest geographic tip of Asia to Europe, encompassing at least some 1,000 metres of open. Years later, Xerxes I would construct a similar boat bridge across the Dardanelles (Hellespont) strait (480 BC), during his invasion of Greece.

The Byzantines called the Bosporus "Stenon" and used the following major toponyms in the area:
 on the European side:
 Bosporios Akra
 Argyropolis
 St. Mamas
 St. Phokas
 Hestiai or Michaelion
 Phoneus
 Anaplous or Sosthenion
 on the Asian side:
 Hieron tower
 Eirenaion
 Anthemiou
 Sophianai
 Bithynian Chrysopolis

The strategic significance of the Strait was one of the factors in the decision of the Roman Emperor Constantine the Great to found his new capital, Constantinople, there in AD 330. This then became the capital of the Eastern Roman Empire.

Ottoman era (1453–1922) 

On 29 May 1453, the then-emergent Ottoman Empire conquered the city of Constantinople following a lengthy campaign during which the Ottomans constructed fortifications on each side of the strait, the Anadoluhisarı (Anatolian Castle, 1393) and the Rumelihisarı (European Castle, 1451), in preparation for not only the primary battle but to assert long-term control over the Bosporus and surrounding waterways. The final 53-day campaign, which resulted in Ottoman victory, constituted an important turn in world history. Together with Christopher Columbus's first voyage to the Americas in 1492, the 1453 conquest of Constantinople is commonly noted as among the events that brought an end to the Middle Ages and marked the transition to the Renaissance and the Age of Discovery.

The event also marked the end of the Byzantines—the final remnants of the Roman Empire—and the transfer of the control of the Bosporus into Ottoman hands. The Ottomans then made Constantinople their new capital, and the base from which they expanded their empire in the centuries that followed.

At its peak between the 16th and 18th centuries, the Ottoman Empire was able to use the strategic importance of the Bosporus to wrest control of the entire Black Sea area, which they regarded as an "Ottoman lake", from which Russian warships were prohibited.

Subsequently, several international treaties have governed access to the Strait. Under the Treaty of Hünkâr İskelesi of 8 July 1833, the Bosporus and Dardanelles straits were to be closed to the naval vessels of other powers on Russian demand. By the terms of the London Straits Convention, concluded on 13 July 1841 between the Great Powers of Europe (Russia, the United Kingdom, France, Austria and Prussia), the "ancient rule" of the Ottoman Empire was re-established by closing the Turkish Straits to all warships, barring those of the Sultan's allies during wartime. This benefited British naval power at the expense of the Russians, as the latter then lacked direct access to the Mediterranean.

Summer Embassies 
During the 19th century many of the foreign powers represented in Constantinople maintained second embassies up the Bosporus and would relocate their staff there during the hot, humid summer months. Most of these summer embassies were on the European shore at Yeniköy (Austrian), Tarabya (German, English, French, Italian) and Büyükdere (Spanish, Russian). Some of the buildings still survive today although the British Summer Embassy burnt down in 1911 and the Italian Summer Embassy, a fine building by Raimondo d'Aronco, survives in very dilapidated condition.

Turkish republican era (1923–present) 
Following the First World War, the 1920 Treaty of Sèvres demilitarised the Strait and made it an international territory under the control of the League of Nations. This was amended by the Treaty of Lausanne (1923), which restored the straits to Turkey but allowed all foreign warships and commercial shipping to traverse the straits freely. Turkey eventually rejected the terms of that treaty, and remilitarised the straits area. The reversion was formalised under the Montreux Convention Regarding the Regime of the Turkish Straits of 20 July 1936. That convention - which is still in force - treats the straits as an international shipping lane except that Turkey retains the right to restrict the naval traffic of non–Black Sea states.

Turkey was neutral in the Second World War until February 1945, and the straits were closed to the warships of belligerent nations during this time, although some German auxiliary vessels were permitted to transit. In diplomatic conferences, Soviet representatives had expressed an interest in obtaining naval bases on the straits. This, together with Stalin's demands for the restitution of the Turkish provinces of Kars, Artvin and Ardahan to the Soviet Union (which were lost by Turkey in the Russo-Turkish War of 1877–1878, but were regained with the Treaty of Kars in 1921), was a consideration in Turkey's decision to abandon neutrality in foreign affairs. Turkey declared war against Germany in February 1945, but did not engage in offensive actions.

Turkey joined NATO in 1952, thus affording the straits even more strategic importance as a commercial and military waterway.

During the early 21st century, the Turkish Straits have become particularly important for the oil industry. Russian oil, from ports such as Novorossiysk, was exported by tankers primarily to the U.S. via the Bosporus and the Dardanelles straits.

Istanbul Canal 
In 2011, Turkey proposed to build a  canal west of the Bosporus, suggesting that it would reduce the risk presented to the Bosporus by oil tankers and other cargo ships. The project proved highly controversial and, work had not been started on building the canal even though a route for it had been established.

In mythology 
The Bosphorus takes its name from the Greek mythological story of Io, who was transformed into a cow and, pursued by a gadfly, was condemned to wander the Earth until she reached the Strait. There she met the Titan Prometheus, who comforted her by telling her that she would be restored to human form by Zeus and become the ancestor of the greatest of all heroes, Heracles (Hercules).

According to ancient Greek mythology, it was said that colossal floating rocks known as the Symplegades, or Clashing Rocks, once guarded both sides of the Bosporus and destroyed any ship that attempted to pass through the strait by crushing them. Their destructive power was finally overcome by the Argonaut hero Jason who managed to pass between them unscathed, whereupon the rocks became fixed, opening Greek access to the Black Sea.

Crossings

Maritime 
The Bosporus is traversed by numerous passenger and vehicular ferries daily, as well as by recreational and fishing boats ranging from dinghies to yachts owned by both public and private entities.

The Strait also serves a significant amount of international commercial shipping traffic in the form of freighters and tankers. Between its northern limits at Rumeli Feneri and Anadolu Feneri and its southern ones at Ahırkapı Feneri and Kadıköy İnciburnu Feneri, there are numerous dangerous points for large-scale maritime traffic that require sharp turns and management of visual obstructions. Famously, the stretch between Kandilli Point and Aşiyan requires a 45-degree course alteration in a location where the currents can reach . To the south, at Yeniköy, the necessary course alteration is 80 degrees. Compounding these difficult changes in trajectory, the rear and forward sight lines at Kandilli and Yeniköy are also completely blocked prior to and during the course alteration, making it impossible for ships approaching from the opposite direction to see around the bends. The risks posed by this geography are further multiplied by the heavy ferry traffic across the Strait, linking the European and Asian sides of the city. As such, all the dangers and obstacles characteristic of narrow waterways are present and acute in this vital sea lane.

It was suggested that this would reduce the risk from shipping to the Bosporus. The controverislal Kanal İstanbul project continues to be debated.

In 2022 the dues levied by Turkey for freight ships increased 500% to US$4 per ton, the first change since 1983.

Land bridges 
Two suspension bridges and a cable-stayed bridge cross the Bosporus. The first Bosporus Bridge forms part of the O1 Motorway, while the Fatih Sultan Mehmet Bridge forms part of the Trans-European Motorway. It is located near the northern end of the Bosporus, between the villages of Garipçe on the European side and Poyrazköy on the Asian side, as part of the "Northern Marmara Motorway", integrated into the existing Black Sea Coastal Highway, and allowing transit traffic to bypass city traffic.

Submarine 

The Eurasia Tunnel is a  undersea highway tunnel designed for vehicular traffic between Kazlıçeşme on the European side of Istanbul and Göztepe on the Asian side. Construction began in February 2011, and the tunnel opened on 20 December 2016.

Up to four submarine fibre optics lines (MedNautilus and possibly others) approach Istanbul, coming from the Mediterranean through the Dardanelles.

Strategic importance 

The Bosporus is the only way for Bulgaria, Georgia, Romania, Russia (south-western part) and Ukraine to reach the Mediterranean Sea and other seas. Thus sovereignty over the straits is an important issue for these countries, as well as Turkey, the state the Bosporus actually flows through.

Turkey does not receive tolls from ships passing through the strait. Turkey's military has broad powers in accordance with the terms of the Montreux Convention. As of 2021, the Bosporus Command is located on the shores of the Bosporus and the military ships connected to the Command are anchored in the Bosporus waters.

Located on a peninsula at the intersection of the Black Sea, the Bosporus and the Marmara Sea, Istanbul has historically been one of the most protected and hardest-to-conquer cities from Roman times to the Ottoman Empire. Divided by the Bosporus, it is one of very few intercontinental cities in the world.

Sightseeing 

The Bosporus has 620 waterfront houses (yalı) built during the Ottoman period along the Strait's European and Asian shorelines. Ottoman palaces such as the Topkapı Palace, Dolmabahçe Palace, Yıldız Palace, Çırağan Palace, Feriye Palaces, Beylerbeyi Palace, Küçüksu Palace, Ihlamur Palace, Hatice Sultan Palace and Adile Sultan Palace also stand on or near its shores. Other buildings and landmarks on the Bosporus include the Kılıç Egyptian Consulate at Bebek, Bebek Mosque, Boğaziçi University, Robert College, Rumeli Castle (RumelihisarI), Borusan Museum of Contemporary Art, Sakıp Sabancı Museum, Sadberk Hanım Museum, Üsküdar Mihrimah Sultan Mosque,  Şemsipaşa Mosque, Maiden's Tower (Kızkulesi), Beylerbeyi Mosque, Anadolu Castle (Anadoluhisarı), Kuleli Military High School, Adile Sultan Palace,  Küçüksu Pavilion, Khedive's Villa, Beykoz Mecidiye Pavilion and Yoros Castle (Anadaolu Kavağı).

Most of the public ferries that traverse the Strait leave from Eminönü on the historic peninsula of Istanbul and travel as far as Anadolu Kavağı near the Black Sea. On the way they call briefly at points on both the European and Asian shores. Private ferries, also leaving from Eminönü, travel only as far as one of the first two Bosporus bridges. Ferries from Eminönü also travel as far as Rumeli Kavaği, stopping only at points on the European shore, while other ferries from Üsküdar travel as far as Anadolu Kavağı, stopping only at points on the Asian shore. Frequent public ferries from Eminõnü, Karaköy, Beşiktaş, Kadıköy and Usküdar offer short hops from one side of the Bosporus to the other throughout the day.

Catamaran sea buses offer high-speed commuter services between the European and Asian shores of the Bosporus, but they stop at fewer ports and piers in comparison to the public ferries. Both the public ferries and the sea buses also provide commuter services between the Bosporus and the Prince Islands in the Sea of Marmara.

Tourist cruises are available from various points along the Bosporus, including Ortaköy. The prices vary considerably, and some feature music and dining.

Architecture 

The many yalı (waterside mansions) which were constructed along the shores of the Bosporus during the Ottoman period have long been synonymous with the Strait. Those that still preserve their original form are among the most expensive real estate in Turkey although sadly many have been lost to time, weather and 'accidental' fires. The oldest yalı on the European shore is the Şerifler Yalı at Emirgan which was built in the 18th century and belonged for a while to the Şerifs, the hereditary rulers of Mecca. It is still in good condition unlike the oldest yalı on the Asan side which is the Köprülü Amcazade Hüseyin Paşa Yalı at Anadolu Hisarı which was built in 1698. Only the central section of this yalı survives and it has been behind hoardings promising restoration since 2009.

Most of the yalıs originally sat right on the water's edge and came with private docks and ports where boats (caiques) could be stored. On the Anatolian shore some yalıs are still right beside the water but on the European shore most now stand back behind a coast road built on reclaimed land.

The original yalıs usually had two main sections: the selamlık which was the public area and the part of the house used by the men, and the haremlik which was the private part of the house reserved for women and the family. These were the luxurious dwellings of the wealthy and some came with their own private hamams (Turkish baths).

Egyptian legacy 
During the late 19th and early 20th centuries, the Egyptian royal family took a great liking to the Bosporus and often spent their summers on its shores. They left behind a legacy of fine buildings on or overlooking its shores, including the building at Bebek that now houses the Egyptian Consulate and the Khedive's Villa (Hıdiv Kasrı) high on the hill above Çubuklu.

See also 
 Black Sea trade and economy
 Great Istanbul Tunnel, a proposed three-level road-rail undersea tunnel
 Istanbul Canal
 List of maritime incidents in the Turkish Straits
 Public transport in Istanbul
 Rail transport in Turkey
 Eastern Bosphorus

Notes

References

Sources

External links 

 

 
Landforms of Istanbul Province
Straits of the Mediterranean Sea
Straits of Turkey
Tourism in Istanbul
Turkish Straits
Important Bird Areas of Turkey